Nguyễn Thụy Anh (Russian: Нгуен Тхюи Ань; born 5 April 1974) is a Vietnamese woman author.

Biography
Nguyễn Thụy Anh was born in Hanoi. Her parents came from Hà Tĩnh, inside, her father has ever been in the navy.

About 1989 – 1991, she was the pupil at the Hanoiamsterdam High School. Then she became the student of the Moscow State Pedagogical University during 17 years and graduated with the EdD's diploma in 2002.

After school, Nguyễn Thụy Anh became a freelancer for Hanoi's magazine Mother and Child (Mẹ và Bé) about short times. She founded the club Reading Books with Our Children (Câu lạc bộ Đọc Sách Cùng Con) as the chairwoman.

Works
Nguyễn Thụy Anh has been known much as the poet with many "As Bergholz" poems for women and children.

Poem
 Lilac (Tử đinh hương) : Love poems.
 The hedgehog (Nhim nhỉm nhìm nhim) : Poems for children, Young Publishing House, 2014.
 Yore, nowaday, futurology (Ngày xưa, ngày nay, ngày sau) : Poems for children, Young Publishing House, 2014.
 Tiger mom is sweet (Mẹ hổ dịu dàng) : Poems for children, Young Publishing House, 2014.
 Hilarity with Vietnamese language (Vui cùng tiếng Việt) : Poems for children, Young Publishing House, 2014.

Literature
 100 grams of happiness (100 gram hạnh phúc) : Dissertations, Young Publishing House, 2013.

Translation
 My Olga Berggoltz (Olga Berggoltz của tôi) : Olga Berggoltz's works to Vietnamese language, Young Publishing House, 2010.
 Night watch (Tuần đêm) : Sergei Lukyanenko's to Vietnamese, Young Publishing House, 2010.
 Day watch (Tuần ngày) : Sergei Lukyanenko's to Vietnamese, Young Publishing House, 2017.

See also
 Olga Bergholz

References

Sources
 Gia đình gắn kết khi cha mẹ dành thời gian cho con
 Giáo dục trẻ không phải là uốn cây cảnh theo ý mình
 Các em nhỏ không thờ ơ với sách
 Nguyen-thuy-Anh's books for children

1974 births
Living people
People from Hanoi
Vietnamese women poets
Vietnamese women writers
Vietnamese women journalists
21st-century Vietnamese women